Liu Kunyi (January21, 1830October6, 1902) was a Chinese official who came to prominence during the government suppression of the Taiping Rebellion and was active in the following  Self-Strengthening Movement  in the second half of the nineteenth century, the late Qing dynasty. He was native of Xinning County, Hunan.

Biography
Liu held a senior licentiate degree (jinshi) from the imperial examination system. He entered the Hunan army in 1855, and worked under Li Hongzhang during the suppression of the Taiping Rebellion. In recognition of his services, he was created a baron and awarded the position of governor of Jiangxi, a role in which he served from 1865 to 1874.

In 1875, he was given the position of Viceroy of Liangjiang, but was almost immediately transferred to the post of Viceroy of Liangguang, where he remained for the next four years.  He was then returned to the former post, where he served until 1881.

In addition to his regular duties in this post, he was asked in 1880 to advise the emperor on Chinese diplomatic policy toward Russia and Japan.  After the French invasion of Vietnam, he also advised the emperor on that matter.  Liu spent the next several years in retirement, but was recalled to the same post as Viceroy of Liangjiang in 1890.

He contained several anti-missionary movements for the next four years, until he was made Imperial Commissioner in charge of troops at Shanhaiguan, a strategic pass between Zhili and Fengtian.

Liu urged the imperial court to prolong the First Sino-Japanese War, hoping for a favorable outcome for the Chinese side, but returned to his post after the Treaty of Shimonoseki was signed in 1895.

In 1900, Liu gained distinction for controlling the Boxer Rebellion and not following the Imperial edict to exterminate all foreigners in China. Liu Kunyi died in 1902, shortly after submitting three joint memorials on reform to the Emperor.

References

|-

|-

|-

1830 births
1902 deaths
Politicians from Shaoyang
Political office-holders in Guangdong
Political office-holders in Jiangsu
Qing dynasty politicians from Hunan
Viceroys of Liangjiang
Viceroys of Liangguang
Xiang Army personnel